Faiza Zafar (born 4 March 1996 in Sialkot) is a Pakistani professional squash player. As of February 2018, she was ranked number 174 in the world. She made her Commonwealth Games debut for Pakistan at the 2018 Commonwealth Games. She won the 2018 PSF Pakistan Squash Circuit I professional PSA World Tour tournament. Her younger sister Madina Zafar is also a fellow squash player who competes for Pakistan in international level.

Career 
She made her maiden Commonwealth Games appearance at the 2018 Commonwealth Games along with her sister Madina Zafar. Faiza partnered Madina Zafar in the women's doubles event during the 2018 Commonwealth Games and were eliminated from the group stage.

Faiza Zafar took part in the 2018 PSF Pakistan Squash Circuit I event as a part of 2018 PSA World Tour and emerged as champion by defeating her sister Madina Zafar in the final.

References

1996 births
Living people
Pakistani female squash players
Commonwealth Games competitors for Pakistan
Squash players at the 2018 Commonwealth Games
Asian Games competitors for Pakistan
Squash players at the 2018 Asian Games
South Asian Games silver medalists for Pakistan
South Asian Games bronze medalists for Pakistan
Sportspeople from Sialkot
South Asian Games medalists in squash